Kato Mylos is a village in the Limassol District of Cyprus, located east of Pelendri.

References

Communities in Limassol District